Arenal District may refer to:

 Arenal District, Paita, in Paita province, Piura region, Peru
 Arenal District, Tilarán, in Tilarán Canton, Guanacaste province, Costa Rica